Saxifraga platysepala is a species of flowering plant belonging to the family Saxifragaceae.

Its native range is Subarctic.

References

platysepala